Pingli County is a county the southeast of Shaanxi province, China, bordering Chongqing to the south and Hubei province to the east. It is under the administration of the prefecture-level city of Ankang.

History
Han dynasty tomb unearthed in 2006

In January 2006 during the construction of a plaza in Pingli County a Han dynasty era tomb was uncovered, during its excavation archeologists found 259 Wu Zhu cash coins, one tripod made from iron, a pottery kitchen range as well as three pottery urns.

Administrative divisions
As 2019, Pingli County is divided to 11 towns.
Towns

Climate

References 

County-level divisions of Shaanxi
Ankang